Chekmagushevsky District (Saqmağoş rayonı) is an administrative and municipal district (raion), one of the fifty-four in the Republic of Bashkortostan, Russia. It is located in the west of the republic and borders with Dyurtyulinsky District in the north, Kushnarenkovsky District in the east, Blagovarsky District in the southeast, Buzdyaksky District in the south, Sharansky District in the southwest, Bakalinsky District in the west, and with Ilishevsky District in the northwest. Its administrative center is the rural locality (a selo) of Chekmagush. As of the 2010 Census, the total population of the district was 30,780, with the population of Chekmagush accounting for 37.0% of that number.

History
The district was established in 1930.

Administrative and municipal status
Within the framework of administrative divisions, Chekmagushevsky District is one of the fifty-four in the Republic of Bashkortostan. The district is divided into thirteen selsoviets, comprising seventy-eight rural localities. As a municipal division, the district is incorporated as Chekmagushevsky Municipal District. Its thirteen selsoviets are incorporated as thirteen rural settlements within the municipal district. The selo of Chekmagush serves as the administrative center of both the administrative and municipal district.

References

Notes

Sources

Districts of Bashkortostan
States and territories established in 1930